Stay is a crime novel by Nicola Griffith.  It is a sequel to her 1998 novel The Blue Place, and continues the story of its protagonist, Aud Torvingen.

The book was a finalist for the Lambda Literary Award for Lesbian Fiction in 2003.

References

External links
 — Stay (2002)

2002 British novels
Crime novels
Novels by Nicola Griffith
Nan A. Talese books
British LGBT novels